The Rund um die Hainleite is a classic cycling race in and around the German city of Erfurt, Germany. Since 2005, it has been part of the UCI Europe Tour, being organised as 1.1 race. First held in 1907, it is the oldest cycling race still running in Germany.

Winners

External links
 Official website 

UCI Europe Tour races
Cycle races in Germany
Recurring sporting events established in 1907
1907 establishments in Germany
Sport in Erfurt